Stuart Wayne Jackson (born December 11, 1955) is an American basketball executive and former basketball coach. He currently serves as the director of basketball operations for the French professional club Élan Béarnais based in Pau. Jackson has coached the New York Knicks from 1989 to 1990, and the Vancouver Grizzlies in 1997, and has also served as the Grizzlies' general manager. He is the former executive vice president of the National Basketball Association (NBA).

Career
Jackson played basketball at the University of Oregon and Seattle University. He worked as an associate coach and head recruiting coordinator under Rick Pitino at Providence College from 1985 to 1987. He also worked as an assistant coach at Washington State University from 1983 to 1985 and at the University of Oregon from 1981 through 1983. Jackson was named the head coach of the New York Knicks in 1989 at the age of 33, becoming the then second-youngest head coach in NBA history. The Knicks went 52–45 during his tenure, upsetting the Boston Celtics in the 1990 playoffs before losing to the eventual NBA champions Detroit Pistons.

He was head coach of the Wisconsin Badgers in the 1992–93 and 1993–94 seasons, leading the Badgers to the 1994 NCAA tournament. He was general manager of the NBA's Vancouver Grizzlies for the franchise's first five seasons, during which the Grizzlies lost 300 of 378 games. In June 2007, he became the executive vice president of basketball operations for the NBA, a league official whose duties included penalizing players for on-court misconduct. His duties included being in charge of on-the-court operations, scheduling, game rules, conduct, discipline and serving as the chair of the Competition Committee. Jackson holds a bachelor's degree in business administration from Seattle University. Jackson resides in New York with his four daughters.

College head coaching record

NBA head coaching record

|-
| align="left"|New York
| align="left"|
| 82 || 45 || 37 ||  || align="center"|3rd in Atlantic || 10 || 4 || 6 || 
| align="center"|Lost in Conference semifinals
|-
| align="left"|New York
| align="left"|
| 15 || 7 || 8 ||  || align="center"|(resigned) || — || — || — || —
| align="center"|–
|-
| align="left"|Vancouver
| align="left"|
| 39 || 6 || 33 ||  || align="center"|7th in Midwest || — || — || — || —
| align="center"|Missed playoffs
|- class="sortbottom"
| align="left" colspan="2"|Career
| 136 || 58 || 78 ||  || || 10 || 4 || 6 ||  ||

References

External links
 Stu Jackson profile at NBA.com
 BasketballReference.com: Stu Jackson
 Image of USC's John Lambert going up for a basket as Oregon's Stu Jackson watches during game in Los Angeles, California, 1975. Los Angeles Times Photographic Archive (Collection 1429). UCLA Library Special Collections, Charles E. Young Research Library, University of California, Los Angeles.

Living people
1955 births
African-American basketball coaches
African-American sports executives and administrators
American expatriate basketball people in Canada
American men's basketball players
American sports executives and administrators
Basketball coaches from Pennsylvania
Basketball players from Pennsylvania
College men's basketball head coaches in the United States
National Basketball Association league office executives
New York Knicks head coaches
Oregon Ducks men's basketball coaches
Oregon Ducks men's basketball players
Providence Friars men's basketball coaches
Sportspeople from Reading, Pennsylvania
Vancouver Grizzlies head coaches
Washington State Cougars men's basketball coaches
Wisconsin Badgers men's basketball coaches
21st-century African-American people
20th-century African-American sportspeople